Yunusov (Russian: Юнусов) is an Azerbaijani and Central Asian masculine surname slavicised from Yunus, its feminine counterpart is Yunusova. It may refer to
Choʻlpon (Abdulhamid Yunusov, 1893–1938), Uzbek poet, playwright, novelist, and literary translator
Anvar Yunusov (born 1987), Tajikistan boxer
Arif Yunusov (born 1955), Azerbaijani author, historian, and human rights activist
Khalim Yunusov (born 1997), Russian football player
Sabir Yunusov (1909–1995), Soviet chemist
Timati (born Timur Yunusov in 1983), Russian artist 

Azerbaijani-language surnames
Patronymic surnames
Surnames from given names